Tazeh Qaleh may refer to various places in Iran:
 Tazeh Qaleh, East Azerbaijan
 Tazeh Qaleh, Bojnord, North Khorasan Province
 Tazeh Qaleh, Maneh and Samalqan, North Khorasan Province
 Tazeh Qaleh, Shirvan, North Khorasan Province
 Tazeh Qaleh, Bukan, West Azerbaijan Province
 Tazeh Qaleh, Naqadeh, West Azerbaijan Province
 Tazeh Qaleh, Piranshahr, West Azerbaijan Province